During the 1929–30 season 'Associazione Sportiva Ambrosiana competed in Serie A and Mitropa Cup.

Summary 
New club chairman Oreste Simonotti changed the club's name to Associazione Sportiva Ambrosiana and restored the previous black-and-blue jerseys. The new colors were a legacy from Unione Sportiva Milanese, before the merger. Hungarian manager Árpád Weisz returned to the bench, and  arrived from Casale as new chairman due to deficit left by former chairman .

In  a 1929–30 Serie A campaign changing competition format to a sole group, Ambrosiana debut match was a triumph against Livorno. By 16 February 1930, the squad counts 23 points (with a match pending against Juventus). Played the game on 20 April, Ambrosiana took an advantage of + 4 points over Juventus and Genova. The success was determined in direct matches between teams programmed for last round on Sunday. On 8 June in Genova, Juventus is defeated 2-0 falling to − 6 points. Meanwhile, Ambrosiana draw 3–3 at home against Liguria (included a penalty missed in last minutes) standing with 4 points of advantage. The scudetto is clinched on 29, with a victory in stadio San Siro against Torino taking Ambrosiana to a 50 points and leadership. Crucial to the trophy was Giuseppe Meazza, league topscorer: 31 goals.

The squad competed in 1930 Mitropa Cup defeated in semifinals by Sparta Praha.

Squad 

 (Captain)

Competitions

Serie A

League table

Matches

Statistics

Squad statistics

Players statistics

See also 
Fabrizio Melegari (a cura di). Almanacco illustrato del calcio, la storia 1898–2004. Modena, Panini, 2004.
Carlo F. Chiesa. Il grande romanzo dello scudetto, da Calcio 2000, annate 2002 e 2003

References

External links 

Inter Milan seasons
Internazionale Milano
Italian football championship-winning seasons